E.J. Koh is an American poet, author and translator of Korean literature whose memoir The Magical Language of Others was released by Tin House Books in 2020 and received the 2021 Washington State Book Award for Biography/Memoir and the 2021 Pacific Northwest Book Award. Her poetry collection A Lesser Love was published by LSU Press in 2017 won the Pleiades Press Editors Prize.

Koh is the recipient of The Virginia Faulkner Award and fellowships from the American Literary Translators Association, Jack Straw Writers Program, Kundiman (nonprofit organization), MacDowell Colony, Napa Valley Writers' Conference, and Vermont Studio Center.

Early life and education 
Koh was born in 1988 in San Jose, California. Koh earned her MFA at Columbia University in New York for Creative Writing and Literary Translation. She is completing her PhD at the University of Washington in English Language and Literature.

Career 

Her memoir, The Magical Language of Others, published in 2020, weaves the stories of four generations of women in Koh's family. Interspersed with letters exchanged between mother and daughter, the text illustrates how language ties them together.

Bibliography 

 The Magical Language of Others,  New York : Tin House, 2020. 
 A Lesser Love: LSU Press, 2017.

References

External links 
 
 

21st-century American women writers
1988 births
Living people